Sotelo may refer to:

People 
People with the surname Sotelo include:
 Pablo Sotelo, vocalist/guitarist of alternative-rock band, Inner Wave
 Beth Sotelo, American comic book colorist
 Gerardo Sotelo (born 1958), Uruguayan journalist
 Guillermo Sotelo (born 1991), Argentine professional footballer
 Gustavo Sotelo (born 1968), Paraguayan footballer who played for clubs of Paraguay, Uruguay, Brazil and Chile
 Julián Sotelo (born 1965), Spanish male javelin thrower
 Luis Sotelo (1574–1624), Franciscan friar who died as a martyr in Japan in 1624, beatified by Pope Pius IX in 1867
 Mauricio Sotelo (born 1961), Spanish composer and conductor 
 Miguel Sotelo (1934–2007), Mexican professional baseball pitcher and manager who spent more than 25 years in professional baseball
 Spencer Sotelo, member of the American progressive metal band Periphery
 Gumercindo Álvarez Sotelo (born 1962), Mexican politician from the National Action Party
 José Calvo Sotelo (1893–1936), Spanish jurist and politician
 Karina Labastida Sotelo (born 1976), Mexican politician affiliated with the MORENA
 Juan Sánchez Sotelo (born 1987), Argentine football striker 
  (born 1993), Spanish journalist and playwright
  (born 1901), Argentine producer, screenwriter, production designer and director
 Gerardo Matos Rodríguez (1897–1948), Uruguayan musician, composer and journalist also known as Gerardo Rodríguez Sotelo

See also 
 Calvo Sotelo, people with the surname
 CF Calvo Sotelo
 Cadiz CF Sotelo, a professional beach soccer team based in Cádiz, Andalusia, Spain